{{DISPLAYTITLE:C6H13NO4}}
The molecular formula C6H13NO4 (molar mass: 163.17 g/mol, exact mass: 163.0845 u) may refer to:

 Bicine
 1-Deoxynojirimycin, or moranolin
 Perosamine
 Migalastat

Molecular formulas